Sitamgar is a Pakistani romantic drama serial directed by Fahim Burney, broadcasting on Hum TV every Thursday between October 2012 to March 2013. The serial is written by Sarwat Nazeer, stars Angeline Malik, Nadia Hussain, Sajal Aly, Azfar Rehman and Ali Afzal. The serial was first aired on 18 October 2012 and last aired on 7 March 2013.

This show was broadcast on Indian Channel Zindagi from 28 November 2015.

Plot 
The story starts with Zoya (Sajal Aly) who is wandering around a mall in Dubai where she finds a cute doll that she wants to buy. At the same time, Zohaib (Faisal Rehman) sees the same doll and pleads Zoya to give it to him. Zoya disagrees, saying she found it first and leaves with it. Upset by this, Zohaib walks away and sits on a bench all alone when Zoya comes up to him and gives him the doll. a few hours later, he finds Zoya sitting alone outside ad finds out that her car has broken down. He offers her a ride home, where she asks him to play loud music and does very childish things. Suddenly she faints and Zohaib takes her to the hospital, where her finds out she's anorexic and hasn't eaten for a couple of days. On finding out that Zoya is in the hospital, Sheena (Angeline Malik), Zoya's Ani rushes to the hospital to see her. On seeing Zohaib with Zoya, she asks Zoya who he is and she says he's her boyfriend. Annoyed by this, Zohaib quickly escapes and goes back home.

Meanwhile, in Pakistan, Zohaib's wife Zahra (Sunita Marshall) is shown visiting her sister's house, where she meets Asad (Hassan Ahmed), her sister's brother-in-law who had proposed to her years ago. Zahra had rejected Asad as she was in love with Zohaib, leaving Asad heartbroken for the rest of his life. Zahra is always annoyed by his presence as she thinks her wants to make her feel guilty for rejecting him. Zohaib returns to Pakistan and gifts his daughter the doll that Zoya gave him. On seeing the gift tag with Zoya's name, Zahra asks Zohaib who she is where he explains to her everything that happened in Dubai. When he goes to work a few days later, he finds out that Zoya is his boss Shiraz's (Ali Afzal) daughter. On seeing how uninterested Zoya is in his business, Shiraz asks Zohaib to train her and  make her as hard-working as him. When it is Zoya's birthday, and her dad leaves her for a business trip, Zohaib arranges a party for her just to cheer her up, only forgetting that it's his wedding anniversary the same day. As they dance playfully, Zeba (Nadia Hussain), who is Shiraz's partner, walks in and questions them. Zoya, having hatred towards Zeba chases her away and talks to her harshly. Meanwhile, Zahra is waiting for Zohaib at home. He arrives home very late and tries to make it up to Zahra by dancing with her, but he still thinks of Zoya.

On Shiraz's arrival, he asks Zohaib to take Zoya to an art gallery so she can buy a painting she really likes. Zoya buys a painting for Zohaib and goes to his house to give it to his wife, where she tells her about the birthday party that Zohaib had give her. Zeba tells Shiraz what she saw the other say and how she thinks that Zohaib is using her to get Shiraz's money. Shiraz immediately sends Zoya back to Dubai against her will, where she meets Adil (Azfar Rehman), who is staying over at her Ani's house. She becomes very silent and unhappy, and feels alone. She starts missing Zohaib and even tries to call him. Sheena gets worried when she sees Zoya in this condition. She tries her best to turn her into the old Zoya, but nothing works. She refuses to marry Adil when her fathers asks her to do so, since she is in love with Zohaib. Meanwhile, Shiraz has taken the Dubai assignment away from Zohaib and given it to someone else. Zohaib asks Zoya to help him in vain, but she says no and seeing Zohaib's greed, she gets engaged to Adil. In this time Zeba and Shiraz also get married. Zohaib gets his Dubai project back and meets Zoya again. After having coffee with her and Adil, he finds that Zoya forgot her phone and goes to her house to return it to her. Zoya expresses her love to Zohaib, where Zohaib finds that he loves her too. They start dating and she becomes the same Zoya again. Sheena finds there is something suspicious that is going on and meets with Zohaib. She tells Zohaib to leave Zoya alone. On seeing that everyone is mistaking his love for greed, Zohaib leaves his job at Shiraz's company, and returns to Pakistan in order to sort things with Zahra.

In Pakistan, he sees how dependent Zahra and his daughter are on him and debates on leaving them or not. He tells Zoya he cannot marry her and that she should also forget him. Zoya, brokenhearted agrees to this and continues her relationship with Adil. One day, Zoya suddenly faints and is rushed to hospital. It is soon found that Zoya is suffering for Brain Tumor and is at her last stages. Adil, scared to marry a sick person, breaks his engagement with Zoya and goes back to Australia. Shiraz soon arrives and finds out that Adil has left. Zoya calls Zohaib and tells him what has happened. Zohaib becomes tensed and tells her that he loves her and will come to see her. Zahra overhears all of this, and cries, but lets Zohaib go. Zohaib goes to Dubai and meets Zoya. He brings her back to life and eventually marries her. Zahra is devastated by this news. In this time, Asad comes to help and takes care of her daughter. He tries to slowly bring her back to life and feels as if he has almost won her over. Zoya faints once more, and when taken to the hospital, she  finds out she is pregnant. On hearing this, Zeba objects to her pregnancy saying that she is too sick to be pregnant, but Shiraz doesn't pay much attention to her. Zeba soon starts to get jealous of Zoya and asks Shiraz for their own child, so Zoya's child will not inherit all of Shiraz's empire. Zahra's sister asks her to marry Asad, which she agrees to.

Asad's mother is dying and asks Zahra to decide in Asad's favor. After his mother's death, Asad starts missing her a lot and asks Zahra to marry him. Zahra says nothing and leaves the room. Soon, Zohaib has sent Zahra divorce papers, which she signs against her will. Zeba pressures Shiraz to give her a child, to which he says no. She accuses him of loving Zoya and wanting to give her his whole empire, to which he replies that the money is not his, but his ex-wife's and according to her will, the money now belongs to Zoya and her children. After hearing this, Zeba leaves him. Zohaib starts missing Zahra and his daughter.  He tries to call them and find out what has happened. He asks Zoya if they can keep his daughter with him, to which Zoya says yes. They return to Pakistan, where on seeing Zohaib, Zahra hugs him and professes how much she has missed him. Asad sees this and leaves forever, carrying all of Zahra's memories in his heart. Zohaib tells Zahra that he only married Zoya so he could give her happiness in her last few days. Zoya overhears this and faints. Eventually, Zoya gives birth to a girl and asks Zahra to be her mother, to which Zahra agrees, and afterwards, Zoya dies.

It is shown afterwards that Zahra is now taking care of Zoya's daughter who is named after Zoya. Zohaib asks her to forgive him, to which she says that she had forgiven him, but it will take her time to forget everything he has done to her.

Cast 
 Angeline Malik as Sheena
 Nadia Hussain as Zeba
 Sajal Aly as Zoya
 Azfar Rehman as Adil
 Ali Afzal as Shiraz 
 Sunita Marshall as Zahra
 Faisal Rehman as Zohaib
 Hassan Ahmed as Asad

Soundtrack 

Sitamgar OST is composed and sung by Sohail Haider and the lyrics written by Sabir Zafar.

References

External links 
  of the serial
 

Hum TV original programming
Urdu-language television shows
Pakistani drama television series
2012 Pakistani television series debuts
2013 Pakistani television series endings